Kurdish traditional clothing (Cil û bergî kurdî or Cil û Bergên Kurdî) is an ongoing part of Kurdish heritage.

Types of clothing and accessories 

 Star Xani
 Kattafi
 Kawa u Salta
 Pishten
 Puzawana
 Kolwana
 Klash
Shalvar (wide trousers which close at the ankles closely)

Traditional Kurdish dress 

Kurdish men wear their traditional dress routinely, not only on special occasions. They wear boots made of leather  and sometimes as well sandals. The Kurdish costume was worn many days in the past. Currently some women still wear them on a daily basis, especially by the older generation. The dresses worn on a daily basis tend to be modest in colour and have little or no accessories or embroideries. In the present day the Kurdish dress is more commonly worn on special occasions.

The traditional Kurdish women's outfit includes either a vest or long-sleeved jacket or long overcoat worn over a gown. An underdress and puffy pants are worn beneath the gown. A belt over the gown is also needed. Traditionally women wore Kurdish hats ornamented with valued coloured stones, beads and gold pieces. Over time this has become less common. Now it is more popular among women to only accessorise with gold jewellery.

Usually younger women and young girls wear brightly coloured dresses adorned with many beads and sequins, and the older women wear darker colours. However, older women tend to wear more gold jewellery because traditionally when women married they would receive a dowry of gold jewellery pieces from their groom.

Costume pieces 

 Vest, long-sleeved jacket and overcoat: This is either made from a plain fabric, a velveteen fabric or a sequin covered fabric.
 Gown: This is usually the dazzling masterpiece of the outfit. Most commonly, Kurdish women wear a mesh fabric or a sheer fabric which is ornamented skillfully with many beads or sequins, or both. The embroidery can be the same colour as the fabric, or multicoloured to create a bright dress. The brightly coloured outfits characterize the spirit of the Kurdish people. There are many different structural designs of the gown. The most common ones today are the traditional Kurdish region gown, which is straight top to bottom with very long sleeves, and the Kurdish-Iranian gown which is frilly from the waist down. 
 Under layers: The under dress and trousers are made of a plain satin fabric usually matching the colour of the gown.
 Belt: Fabric belts are colour coordinated with any piece of the outfit. Married women tend to wear gold belts.  There are two common types:
 Lira belt; a gold belt made entirely from connected gold lira coins or dangling gold liras
 Gobarah belt: similar to a lira belt, but the coins are inexpensive
 Trousers: These are a type of traditional Kurdish clothing for men. It consists of two main parts: ranak and chogha, together chokho-raanak (Sorani: چۆخۆ ڕەنەک, in Iran: چوخو رانک)
The rank is worn like pants, but is usually almost twice as wide than normal pants.
The chogha is like a jacket, but the bottom of it goes inside the chogha. In addition, a shirt must be worn under the chogha.
 Traditional hat:  This is usually black velveteen ornamented with traditional amber, turquoise beads, and gold or silver charms.
 Traditional jewellery: This is gold, with gold charms and traditional amber, red or black beads and occasional dangling lira coins.
 Sheelana: This is a long gold necklace with amber, red or black beads and dangling leaf shaped charms.
 Meglad: This is a big black stone dangling from a gold chain.

Modern dress 
The modern Kurdish woman's dress is traditional. They tend to be fashionable amongst Kurdish community. Kurdish women and men have a large collection of Kurdish clothing and are always on the lookout for new designs and fabric. They usually buy the fabrics of their choice and then have clothing tailored, as there are tailors who specialize in making Kurdish clothes. Recently these respected tailors have turned into designers that have created different designs for the conventional structure of the dress. In villages most of the time women tailor for their entire family after everyone makes their own fabric choice.

There are many different styles of the Kurdish clothes, and in recent years there have been many fashion shows, showcased for a Kurdish and international audience. Shows have been held in Vancouver, Canada; in Melbourne, Australia, at the Kurdish Film Festival by the Kurdish Women's Society; and at the Hackney Museum as part of their Kurdish Cultural Heritage Project.

See also 
 History of the Kurds
 Kurdish culture
 Kurdish dance
 Kurdish music
 Kurds
 KurdishMedia.com
 Pashtun clothing

References

External links